Herbert Krautblatt (November 19, 1926 – February 10, 1999) was an American professional basketball player. Krautblatt was selected in the 1948 BAA Draft by the Baltimore Bullets. He played for the Bullets in 1948–49 before ending his Basketball Association of America career after just 10 games.

BAA career statistics

Regular season

References

External links

Krautblatt's entry at JewsInSports.com
Rider University Hall of Fame entry

1926 births
1999 deaths
American men's basketball players
Baltimore Bullets (1944–1954) draft picks
Baltimore Bullets (1944–1954) players
Basketball players from Newark, New Jersey
Guards (basketball)
Jewish men's basketball players
Paterson Crescents players
Rider Broncs men's basketball players